Cicurina cicur is a spider species found in Europe to Central Asia.

See also 
 List of Dictynidae species

References 

Hahniidae
Spiders of Asia
Spiders described in 1793
Spiders of Europe